Robert Todd Hewko (born June 8, 1960) was a quarterback for the Florida Gators during the early 1980s starting three games in the 1980 season, sidelined by Wayne Peace. Hewko was also a professional NFL football quarterback, on the roster for such teams as the Dallas Cowboys and Tampa Bay Buccaneers, although only ever playing in 2 games for the Buccaneers, Hewko did not start the games and both were losses.

During the UF vs FSU game in 1982, Hewko was brought in as quarterback in the second half, but was unable to bring the team to victory without help. With the game tied and 3:47 left, Hewko was the holder on Jim Gainey's game-winning 22-yard field goal.

Hewko is an executive VP of RockStar Investment Group which acquired ownership in an AFL football team, the Jacksonville Sharks, Jacksonville Florida in April 2014.  RockStar Investment Group, owned by Hewko has been sued for fraud.

Hewko is a rare color commentator for the Legends Football League on YouTube, calling the games alongside play by play man and LFL commissioner Mitch Mortaza. He replaced former ESPN analyst Sean Salisbury halfway through the 2012 season, after Salisbury frustrated producers and league executives with unprofessional antics. Hewko had previously worked with Van Earl Wright since taking over the position until Mortaza took over for Wright at the start of the 2013 playoffs. In July 2014, Mortaza left the broadcast booth and Hewko was joined by Chet Buchanan, a midday radio jockey for 98.5 KLUC in Las Vegas, however as of May 2015 Mortaza was again working with Hewko.

References

External links
Career stats
College stats

1960 births
Living people
Players of American football from Pennsylvania
Florida Gators football players
American football quarterbacks
Tampa Bay Buccaneers players